The following is a list of the equipment currently in use in the Border Guards Bangladesh. It includes small arms, vehicles, vessels and aircraft.

Small arms

Anti-tank weapons

Utility vehicles

Aircraft

Vessels

See also
 Bangladesh Armed Forces
 List of equipment of the Bangladesh Army

References

Border Guards Bangladesh